Norm Crewther (14 May 1919 – 20 October 2010) is  a former Australian rules footballer who played with Collingwood in the Victorian Football League (VFL).

He also played for Coburg, South Richmond (VJFL) and East Brunswick Football Clubs.

Norm is the nephew of Collingwood great Bill Proudfoot, and was the oldest living former Collingwood player until his death in 2010.		
		
		Norm is the second great uncle of the former Federal Member for Dunkley, Chris Crewther MP.

Notes

External links 

		
Profile on Collingwood Forever

1919 births
2010 deaths
Australian rules footballers from Victoria (Australia)
Collingwood Football Club players